The 2019 AFL Grand Final was an Australian rules football game contested between the Richmond Football Club and Greater Western Sydney Giants at the Melbourne Cricket Ground on 28 September 2019. It was the 124th annual grand final of the Australian Football League (formerly Victorian Football League), staged to determine the premiers for the 2019 AFL season. The match, attended by 100,014 spectators, was won by Richmond by a margin of 89 points, marking the club's twelfth VFL/AFL premiership and their second in three seasons. Richmond's Dustin Martin won the Norm Smith Medal as the player judged best on ground.

Background

Richmond suffered misfortune during the first half of the season, with several of their star players sidelined due to injury – including star defender Alex Rance, and young stars in Jack Higgins, Sydney Stack and Jack Graham. At the conclusion of Round 14, the Tigers were ninth on the ladder with an average 7–6 win–loss record; however, they did not lose again in the home-and-away season, winning their last nine games to finish third with a 16–6 record. The Tigers advanced directly to the preliminary final after a 47-point victory over Brisbane in the qualifying final; then, in the preliminary final, overcame a 21-point half time deficit to defeat  by 19 points.

 started season 2019 having been eliminated from the 2018 season in the semi-finals. The club lost co-captain Callan Ward to an ACL injury early in the season, a season-ending injury to star midfielder Stephen Coniglio later in the year. A strong start to the year saw the Giants placed second after Round 11, but indifferent form and a 5–6 record in the second half of the year, saw the Giants qualify for the finals in sixth with a 13–9 win–loss record. However, strong form in September saw the Giants win three finals to qualify for the grand final: a dominant win against  by 58 points in the elimination final, then two thrilling victories – a three-point win over Brisbane in the semi-final, and a four-point win against Collingwood in the preliminary final. It was just the second time since the introduction of the AFL final eight system in 2000 that a team reached the grand final without finishing inside the top four, after the Bulldogs' 2016 victory.

The teams met twice during the home-and-away season; first in Round 3 at Giants Stadium when the Giants thrashed Richmond by 49 points, and then in Round 17 at the MCG when the Tigers won by 27 points.

It was Richmond's 23rd grand final appearance, and second in three years; and it was the first grand final appearance for Greater Western Sydney. The sides had previously contested one final, the 2017 preliminary final won by Richmond by 36 points. It was the eighth consecutive grand final which featured one Victorian team and one non-Victorian team, and it was only the second grand final in VFL/AFL history (and the first since 1980) that did not feature either team that finished first or second on the ladder at the conclusion of the home-and-away season.

As the higher-ranked team, Richmond wore its full home kit, and GWS wore its predominantly white clash guernsey with white shorts. Richmond was an overwhelming favourite to win, with bookmakers offering odds of $1.44 for a Richmond win compared with $3.25 for a Giants win.

With an average audience of 2.197 million across the five major capital cities, this was the lowest rating AFL Grand Final on free-to-air television since OzTAM began recording television ratings in 2001.

Media coverage

Radio coverage

Entertainment

Tones and I performed "The Kids Are Coming" and "Dance Monkey", and was followed by Dean Lewis, who performed "Be Alright" and "Waves". John Williamson also performed Waltzing Matilda.

Paul Kelly performed "Leaps and Bounds" and "Dumb Things". Mike Brady also performed "Up There Cazaly".

Conrad Sewell performed the Australian National Anthem "Advance Australia Fair".

Richmond chose Maureen Hafey – the widow of legendary Richmond coach Tom Hafey – as their ambassador to carry the premiership cup onto the field, while GWS chose Kevin Sheedy – their first ever coach. Hafey also presented the trophy to Trent Cotchin and Damien Hardwick during the on-field award ceremony.

Match summary

First quarter
The opening term of the grand final was a tough and low-scoring battle of attrition, with neither team scoring a goal in the first twenty minutes of the match. Giants spearhead Jeremy Cameron scored the opening goal of the grand final at the 20-minute mark before two late goals—from Dustin Martin at the 24-minute mark and Daniel Rioli right on the quarter-time siren—saw the Tigers take a seven-point lead at the first break.

Second quarter
Richmond began to pull away from the Giants in the second quarter. They scored five unanswered goals in a dominant quarter; Jack Riewoldt goaled at the four-minute mark of the term, followed by Martin's second goal at the seven-and-a-half minute mark. Tom Lynch scored two minutes later before Riewoldt finished the half with another two majors. Greater Western Sydney were held to just four behinds in the second term, and the Tigers headed to the halftime break with an ominous 35-point lead.

Third quarter
Richmond sealed the premiership with an equally uncompromising third quarter. They scored five goals to one in the term; Lynch kicked his second goal at the five-minute mark before Martin slotted his third seven and a half minutes into the term. Marlion Pickett scored his only goal of the afternoon at the 11th minute, and Kane Lambert scored two minutes after. The Giants finally broke a run of 11 consecutive Richmond goals with a Jacob Hopper major at the 25-minute mark of the quarter, but Ivan Soldo goaled right on the three-quarter-time siren. The margin was 62 points in favour of the Tigers at the final break, and the premiership was now beyond doubt.

Fourth quarter
With the flag under lock and key, the final quarter was a celebration for the Tigers. It was practically a carbon copy of the second and third quarters, with Richmond again scoring five goals and conceding only one. The Giants scored their third and final goal of the game early in the final quarter, with Harry Himmelberg saluting before the second minute, but the Tigers did not allow them to save face and ran away with their most lopsided premiership victory in club history. Shai Bolton scored his first major of the day at the ninth minute, followed by Riewoldt's fourth goal. Richmond skipper Trent Cotchin goaled at the 23-minute mark and was followed soon after by Martin, who also scored his fourth goal of the Grand Final. Riewoldt put the exclamation mark on a supremely emphatic victory, goaling only moments before the siren to increase the final margin to 89 points, the third-highest margin in a Grand Final. It was Richmond's most lopsided Grand Final victory of all time, surpassing their 81-point victory against Collingwood in 1980.

Norm Smith Medal
By unanimous selection – 15 out of 15 possible votes – Dustin Martin was awarded his second Norm Smith Medal after having won it in 2017, making him the fourth player to win multiple Norm Smith Medals after Gary Ayres, Andrew McLeod and Luke Hodge. No other player garnered more than 6 votes, but Bachar Houli finished second as he did in 2017. Chaired by Alastair Lynch, the voters and their choices were as follows:

Teams

The teams were announced on 26 September 2019. Richmond made one change to the side, with Jack Graham dropping out of the side due to a shoulder injury he suffered in the preliminary final. Marlion Pickett, who had never previously played a senior AFL game, took his spot; having previously been picked up from South Fremantle in the WAFL during the midseason draft following the retirement of 2017 Premiership player Shaun Grigg, Pickett had won the Norm Goss Medal in the Richmond reserves' VFL Grand Final victory over Williamstown the previous week. He was the first player to make his senior debut in a Grand Final since Keith Batchelor for Collingwood in 1952.

Richmond fielded sixteen of the twenty-two players who had been part of its premiership team in 2017: Pickett, Tom Lynch, Shai Bolton, Ivan Soldo, Jayden Short and Liam Baker were the new players, and Rance, Grigg, Graham, Jacob Townsend, Dan Butler and Kamdyn McIntosh were the six missing.

Greater Western Sydney, meantime, recalled Toby Greene and Lachie Whitfield, who missed their preliminary final win due to suspension and injury respectively, into their side, with Lachlan Keeffe and Ian Hill omitted to make way. GWS also was missing former Richmond rising star Brett Deledio, after he had been injured earlier in the finals.

Umpires 
The umpiring panel, comprising three field umpires, four boundary umpires, two goal umpires and an emergency in each position is given below.

Numbers in brackets represent the number of grand finals umpired, including 2019.

Scoreboard

References

External links

2019 Australian Football League season
AFL season
2019 in Victoria (Australia)
2010s in Melbourne
AFL Grand Final 2019
VFL/AFL Grand Finals